Botswana competed  at the 1994 Commonwealth Games in Victoria, British Columbia, sending thirty-three athletes in four sports, including their first participation in badminton and boxing.

Medals

Gold
none

Silver
none

Bronze
France Mabiletsa — Boxing, Men's Light Heavyweight (– 81 kg)

Results by event

Athletics
Justice Dipeba 	
Zacharia Ditetso 	
Kabo Gabaseme 	
Jwagamang Karesaza 	
Kenneth Moima 	
Moatshe Molebatsi 	
Dithapelo Molefi 	
Tsoseletso Nkala (née Sekweng) 	
Mothusi Tsiana

Badminton
Javed Aslam	
Bernard Gondo 	
Herbert Kgaswane 	
Tebogo Modisane 	
Tjiyapo Mokobi 	
Mohammed Rana 	
Jennifer Seitshiro 	
Tlamelo Sono

Bowls
Flora Anderson
Shirley Baylis 	
Allen Bergg	
Arthur Hicks 	
Raymond Mascarenhas 
Timothy Morton 		
Jacqueline Rhodes 	
Clifton Richardson

Boxing
Men's Light Flyweight (– 48 kg)
Healer Modiradilo 	
Bye
Lost to Victor Kasote (ZAM), RSCH-2

Men's Lightweight (– 60 kg)
O. Medupi

Men's Featherweight (– 57 kg)
Victor Kgabung 	

Men's Light Welterweight (– 63.5 kg)
Johannes Ditlhabang 	

Men's Welterweight (– 67 kg)
Thuso Khubamang 	

Men's Light Middleweight (– 71 kg)
Baboloki Mogotsi 	
Lost to Kurt Sinette (TRI), 8:11

Men's Middleweight (– 75 kg)
David Nyathi 
Defeated Sam Leuji (NZL), KO-1
Lost to Rasmus Ojemaye (NGA), 4:9

Men's Light Heavyweight (– 81 kg)
France Mabiletsa 	
Defeated Paul Mwasele (TAN), 16:5
Defeated Stephen Kirk (NIR), 15:6
Lost to John Wilson (SCO), 8:13

See also
Botswana at the 1992 Summer Olympics
Botswana at the 1996 Summer Olympics

References
 Official results by country

Commonwealth Games
1994
Nations at the 1994 Commonwealth Games